Hyenas is a 2011 supernatural horror film, written and directed by Eric Weston.

Plot
A woman is driving down a road when she crashes. She then sees a light, before hyenas attack and kill her and her baby. The woman's husband, Gannon (Costas Mandylor), teams up with veteran tracker Crazy Briggs (Meshach Taylor) to track down and kill the hyenas.

Cast
 Costas Mandylor as Gannon
 Christa Campbell as Wilda
 Amanda Aardsma as Valerie
 Derrick Kosinski as Bobby
 Rudolf Martin as Sheriff Manfred
 Joshua Alba as Marco
 Christina Murphy as Gina
 Andrew James Allen as Jasper
 Steele Justiss as Tank
 Meshach Taylor as Crazy Briggs
 Bar Paly as Luna
 Sean Hamilton as Tobias
 Maxie J. Santillan Jr. as Salazar
 Michael Nardelli as Vinnie
 Stephen Taylor as Danny
 Mike Rad as Orville

Reception
Hyenas was described by Bryan Senn in his book The Werewolf Filmography as "poor in all departments", commenting on Amanda Aardsma's "plastic acting" and "cartoonish CGI hyenas". Bruce Kooken, for Horrornews.net, described the special effects as "crash and burn...the CGI effect is really unforgivable".

References

External links
 
 
 

2011 films
2011 horror films
American supernatural horror films
Films shot in California
2010s English-language films
Films directed by Eric Weston
2010s American films